Louis d'Orléans or Louis of Orléans may refer to:

Louis I, Duke of Orléans (1372–1407), younger brother of Charles VI of France
 Louis of Valois (1549–1550), son of Henry II of France
 King Louis XII (1462–1515), Duke of Orléans between 1465 and 1498
Louis I d'Orléans, duc de Longueville (1480–1516), son of François I, Duke of Longueville
Louis, Duke of Orléans (1703–1752), grandfather of Philippe Égalité
Prince Louis, Duke of Nemours (1814–1896), son of Louis-Philippe of France and great-great-grandson of the above
Louis d'Orléans, Prince of Condé (1845–1866), son of Henri d'Orleans, Duke of Aumale

See also
House of Orléans
Duke of Orléans
Louis Dorléans (1542–1629), poet and political pamphleteer